Vindhya Vasini Persaud (born Georgetown, Guyana) is a medical doctor and politician. She is the current Guyanese Minister of Human Services and Social Security. She was appointed Minister since August 2020. She is the daughter of Reepu Daman Persaud.

References 

Living people
Guyanese medical doctors
Members of the National Assembly (Guyana)
Government ministers of Guyana
Women government ministers of Guyana
People's Progressive Party (Guyana) politicians
Year of birth missing (living people)
21st-century Guyanese politicians
21st-century women politicians
People from Georgetown, Guyana